= Disability in Bolivia =

Disability in Bolivia refers to the people with disability in Bolivia.

== History ==
Bolivia signed the Convention on the Rights of Persons with Disabilities on 13 August 2007 and ratified it on 16 November 2009. It went into effect on 16 December 2009.

== Statistics ==
There are currently 741,382 people with various range of disability in the country, in which it is divided into mental disability (222,410 people), physical disability (222,410 people), sensorial disability (259,480 people) and other disability (37,070 people).
